In computing, a command-line interpreter, or command language interpreter, is a blanket term for a certain class of programs designed to read lines of text entered by a user, thus implementing a command-line interface.

Operating system shells

AmigaOS 
 Amiga CLI/Amiga Shell

Unix-like systems 
There are many variants of Unix shell:
 Bourne shell sh
 Almquist shell (ash)
 Debian Almquist shell (dash)
 Bash (Unix shell) bash
 KornShell ksh
 Z shell zsh
 C shell csh
 TENEX C shell tcsh
 Ch shell ch
 Emacs shell eshell
 Friendly interactive shell fish
 PowerShell pwsh
 rc shell rc, a shell for Plan 9 from Bell Labs and Unix
 Stand-alone shell sash
 Scheme Shell scsh

Microsoft Windows

Native 
 COMMAND.COM, the original Microsoft command line processor introduced on MS-DOS as well as Windows 9x, in 32-bit versions of NT-based Windows via NTVDM 
 cmd.exe, successor of COMMAND.COM introduced on OS/2 and Windows NT systems, although COMMAND.COM is still available in virtual DOS machines on IA-32 versions of those operating systems as well. 
 Recovery Console
 Windows PowerShell, a command processor based on .NET Framework
 PowerShell, a command processor based on .NET
 Hamilton C shell, a clone of the  Unix C shell by Hamilton Laboratories
 4NT, a clone of CMD.EXE with additional features by JP Software
 Take Command, a newer incarnation of 4NT

Unix/Linux compatibility layer and POSIX subsystem 
 Interix
 MKS Toolkit
 Microsoft POSIX subsystem
 Windows Services for UNIX
 Windows Subsystem for Linux

CP/M 

 Console Command Processor (CCP), the default command line interpreter
 ZCPR for the Z-System
 Microshell

DOS 

 COMMAND.COM, the default command-line interpreter
 4DOS, a compatible, but more advanced shell by JP Software
 NDOS, provided with some versions of the Norton Utilities
 GW-BASIC

OS/2 

 CMD.EXE, the default command-line interpreter
 Hamilton C shell, a clone of the  Unix C shell by Hamilton Laboratories
 4OS2, a clone of CMD.EXE with additional features by JP Software

IBM i 

 Control Language
 Qshell

Apple computers 
 Apple DOS/Apple ProDOS
 Macintosh Programmer's Workshop

Mobile devices 
 DROS, Java ME platform based DOS-like shell for smartphones

Network routers 

 Cisco IOS
 Junos Command Line Interface (Juniper Networks)

Minicomputer CLIs 
 Data General's CLI (Command Line Interpreter) on RDOS and AOS Operating Systems and their variants
 Digital Equipment Corporation's DIGITAL Command Language (DCL)

Other 
 BASIC-PLUS (RSTS/E)
 CANDE MCS – command-line shell and text editor on the MCP operating system
 Conversational Monitor System (VM/CMS)
 DOS Wedge (an extension to the Commodore 64's BASIC 2.0)
 DIGITAL Command Language (OpenVMS)
 Extensible Firmware Interface shell
 Microsoft BASIC (qualifies both for a programming language and OS)
 Singularity (operating system)
 SymShell, see SymbOS
 Time Sharing Option (MVS, z/OS)
 Atari TOS shell
 YouOS shell
 EFI-SHELL – an open source Extensible Firmware Interface command shell

Programming

Language systems 
 APL (programming language)
 BASIC – actually, many dialects and varieties of a programming language may have commands like kill, system, files, and others which allow operating system access from the interactive and often from programme mode
 BeanShell, a shell for Java
 F Sharp (programming language), F#
 J (programming language)
 Haskell (programming language)
 Lisp
 Common Lisp Interface Manager
 Macintosh Programmer's Workshop, an old command-line environment used for software development on the classic Mac OS
 Prolog
 Smalltalk
 Scala (programming language)
 Standard ML

Debuggers 

 DEBUG
 gdb
 DDT, a PDP-10 debugger from DEC used as a command shell for the MIT Incompatible Timesharing System
 Firebug/Chromebug, a JavaScript shell and debugging environment as a Firefox plugin

Scientific and engineering software 

 MATLAB
 Wolfram Mathematica
 ROOT

Programming languages 

 BeanShell – shell for Java
 JavaScript shell – several programs by this name allow interactive JavaScript
 Javascript Interpreter Shell
 Julia
 Jython
 Perl
 PHPsh – shell for PHP
 Python
 IPython
 REXX
 Ruby
 Interactive Ruby Shell
 Tcl
 Tclsh
 Wish (Windowing Shell)
 tkcon shell and IDE for Tcl/Tk
 Windows Script Host

Database queries 
 sqsh, a shell available with some SQL implementations for database queries and other tasks.
 Google Shell, a browser-based front-end for Google Search

See also 
 read–eval–print loop
 Interpreter directive
 Job Control Language
 Scripting language
 Comparison of command shells
 List of compilers

References 

 
Command-line

pl:Powłoka systemowa